Leonid Klimovsky (born 22 March 1983), is a Russian futsal player who plays for Sibiryak and the Russian national futsal team.

References

External links
FIFA profile
AMFR profile

1983 births
Living people
Futsal goalkeepers
Russian men's futsal players